Melissa Wei-Tsing Inouye is a senior lecturer in Chinese studies at the University of Auckland. She is an expert in the social and cultural history of modern China, charismatic global Christianity, and women and religion.

Early life
Inouye grew up in Costa Mesa, California. She is a fourth-generation Chinese-Japanese American. Her Chinese great-grandfather, Gin Gor Ju, came to the United States from Guangdong province and settled in Utah. Her father's family is originally from Japan. Her father's parents, Bessie Shizuko Murakami Inouye and Charles Ichiro Inouye, met and married in a World War II-era Japanese internment in Heart Mountain, Wyoming.

Education
In 2003 she graduated magna cum laude in East Asian studies from Harvard College, delivering the Harvard Oration at the class day graduation exercises. She received her PhD in East Asian languages and civilizations from Harvard University in 2011. While researching and writing her dissertation, Miraculous Mundane: The True Jesus Church and Chinese Christianity in the Twentieth Century, she lived in Xiamen, China, and was an affiliate of the Shanghai Academy of Social Sciences from 2009 to 2010. She currently serves as an associate editor of the Mormon Studies Review and is a frequent contributor on topics of religion. In 2019 she had her book China and the True Jesus: Charisma and Organization in a Chinese Christian Church published by Oxford University Press.

Personal life
Inouye is married and has four children. She has lived in California, Taiwan, China, Japan, Hong Kong, Massachusetts, Utah and New Zealand. She is a member of the Church of Jesus Christ of Latter-day Saints and served an LDS mission in Taiwan. She was diagnosed with colon cancer in 2017.

Publications
Inouye, M. W. (2018). Speaking in the Devil’s Tongue? The True Jesus Church’s Uneasy Rhetorical Accommodation to Maoism, 1948–1958. Modern China, 44 (6), 1-31. 10.1177/0097700418763557
Inouye, M. W. (2018). Tale of Three Primaries: Critical Mass in Mormonism’s Informal Institutions. In G. Colvin, J. Brooks (Eds.) Decolonizing Mormonism: Approaching a Postcolonial Zion (pp. 229–262). Salt Lake City: University of Utah Press.
Inouye, M. (2017). Charismatic crossings: The transnational, transdenominational friendship of Bernt Berntsen and Wei Enbo. In F. Yang, J. Tong, A. Anderson (Eds.) Global Chinese pentecostal and charismatic christianity (pp. 91–117). Leiden: Brill.
Inouye, M. (2017). Charismatic moderns: Pluralistic discourse within Chinese protestant communities, 1905–1926. Twentieth-Century China, 42 (1), 26-51. 10.1353/tcc.2017.0006
Inouye, M. (2016). A religious rhetoric of competing modernities: Christian print culture in late Qing China. In G. Song (Ed.) Reshaping the boundaries: the Christian intersection of China and the West in the modern era (pp. 106–122). Hong Kong: University of Hong Kong Press.
Inouye, M. (2016). Culture and agency in Mormon women’s lives. In Kate Holbrook, M. Bowman (Eds.) Women and mormonism: Historical and contemporary perspectives (pp. 230–246). Salt Lake City, Utah: University of Utah Press.
Inouye, M.-T. (2015). Miraculous modernity: Charismatic traditions and trajectories within Chinese protestant christianity. In V. Goossaert, J. Kiely, J. Lagerwey (Eds.) Modern Chinese religion II: 1850-2015 (pp. 884–919). Boston and Leiden: Brill Academic Publishers. 10.1163/9789004304642_023
Inouye, M. W. (2014). The Oak and the Banyan: the ‘Glocalization’ of Mormon Studies. Mormon Studies Review, 1, 70-79.

Bibliography
China and the True Jesus: Charisma and Organization in a Chinese Christian Church (Oxford University Press, 2019) 
Crossings: A Bald Asian American Latter-day Saint Woman Scholar’s Ventures through Life, Death, Cancer, and Motherhood (Not Necessarily in that Order) (Maxwell Institute, 2019)

Awards
 2019 AML Award for Creative Nonfiction, Crossings: A bald Asian American Latter-day Saint woman scholar’s ventures through life, death, cancer, and motherhood (not necessarily in that order)

References

External links
 University of Auckland Official Profile
 Global Mormon Studies Network

Living people
Harvard University alumni
Academic staff of the University of Auckland
American expatriates in New Zealand
Latter Day Saints from California
Female Mormon missionaries
American Mormon missionaries in Taiwan
Year of birth missing (living people)